The 1907 WAFL season was the 23rd season of senior Australian rules football in Perth, Western Australia. It was the league's first season under the name West Australian Football League, having changed from West Australian Football Association in March 1907.

It was Perth's first premiership.

Ladder

Grand Final

References

West Australian Football League seasons
WAFL